Jeff Bes (born July 31, 1973) is a Canadian retired professional ice hockey player who played several seasons with the Laredo Bucks. Bes has played for many minor league teams such as the Dayton Bombers, Chicago Wolves, Mississippi Sea Wolves, Orlando Solar Bears, Jacksonville Lizard Kings, SaiPa and several other teams including the Dukes of Hamilton. He also coaches in the Southern Professional Hockey League.

Playing career

Junior 
Born in Tillsonburg, Ontario, Bes started playing hockey at age 2. He began his junior career in 1990–91, playing for the Dukes of Hamilton of the Ontario Hockey League. He would score 23 goals and 47 assists for 70 points. His time with Hamilton would be short lived as the following season they became the Guelph Storm. He played the 1991–92 season with the new, Storm, and finish with 40 goals and 62 assists for 102 points. He spent the 1992-93 campaign with the Storm again, scoring 48 goals and 67 assists.

Professional 
Bes was selected by the Minnesota North Stars in the third round of the 1992 NHL Entry Draft, 58th overall. He would never see regular season action, but was considered a top prospect in the National Hockey League at the time.

Bes spent the next 11 years going back and forth between leagues, such as the International Hockey League, the East Coast Hockey League and the American Hockey League. In 2003, he signed with the Laredo Bucks of the Central Hockey League (CHL). Bes is the Bucks all-time leader in goals, assists, and points a two-time MVP of the CHL. In 2007 Bes took on the responsibilities of being a player and assistant coach with the bucks.

International 
Bes was selected for the 1993 World Junior Ice Hockey Championships in Sweden, where he played on a line with Paul Kariya. He won a gold medal with Team Canada.

Coaching career 
In August 2011, Bes was hired as the head coach of the Mississippi Surge of the Southern Professional Hockey League. Following the Surge folding in May 2014, Bes was hired to coach the Fayetteville FireAntz in 2015. After two seasons with Fayetteville, Bes left the team to be closer to his family in Biloxi, Mississippi, but then took the head coaching job with the Pensacola Ice Flyers for the 2017–18 season. In 2019, he was hired as the SPHL's Evansville Thunderbolts head coach.

Career statistics

Awards and honours

References

External links

1973 births
Living people
Augusta Lynx players
Canadian ice hockey centres
Chicago Wolves players
Espoo Blues players
Greensboro Generals players
Guelph Storm players
Hamilton Dukes players
HDD Olimpija Ljubljana players
Ice hockey people from Ontario
Jackson Bandits players
Jacksonville Lizard Kings players
Kalamazoo Wings (1974–2000) players
Kassel Huskies players
Laredo Bucks players
Minnesota North Stars draft picks
Mississippi Sea Wolves players
Orlando Solar Bears (IHL) players
Pensacola Ice Pilots players
SaiPa players
Sportspeople from Tillsonburg
Springfield Falcons players
Canadian expatriate ice hockey players in Slovenia